Limones is a corregimiento in Barú District, Chiriquí Province, Panama. Its population as of 1990 was 974; its population as of 2000 was 948.

Climate
Limones has a tropical monsoon climate (Am) with moderate to little rainfall from December to April and heavy to very heavy rainfall from May to November.

References

Corregimientos of Chiriquí Province